Andrey Dashuk (born 14 August 1987) is a Belarusian former professional footballer.

External links

1987 births
Living people
Belarusian footballers
FC Gomel players
FC Khimik Svetlogorsk players
FC DSK Gomel players
FC Slutsk players
Association football forwards